Qingyun County is a county of north-northwest Shandong province, People's Republic of China, bordering Hebei province to the north. It is the northernmost county-level division of the prefecture-level city of Dezhou.

The population was 289,986 in 1999.

Administrative divisions
As 2012, this County is divided to 1 subdistrict, 4 towns and 4 townships.
Subdistricts
Bohailu Subdistrict

Towns

Townships

Climate

References

External links
 Official site

Qingyun
Dezhou